The Marbella Club Hotel is a hotel in Marbella, Spain.

The hotel is located on the southern Spanish Costa del Sol, on the "Golden Mile" near Old Town Marbella and Puerto Banús. 

The Marbella Club Hotel was built in 1954 by Prince Alfonso of Hohenlohe-Langenburg as his private residence. It was extensively renovated and enlarged from the mid-1980s through 2000.

The hotel features 121 bedrooms and suites, spread over the beach front resort, and 16 Andalusian-style villas throughout  of gardens. The hotel has 132 rooms. 

In 1999, the hotel completed its own private 18-hole golf course, designed by Dave Thomas. The hotel has a British P.G.A. Professional, Gary Vautier.  A riding stable for hotel guests is also present.

References

External links
Official website
Villa Del Mar of the Marbella Club
The Beginnings of Marbella Club by Count Rudi von Schönburg

Hotels in Marbella
Hotels in Spain
Hotels established in 1954
Hotel buildings completed in 1954